The rufous-winged tyrannulet (Mecocerculus calopterus) is a species of bird in the family Tyrannidae. It is found in Ecuador and Peru. Its natural habitats are subtropical or tropical dry forests and subtropical or tropical moist montane forests.

References

rufous-winged tyrannulet
Birds of Ecuador
Birds of the Peruvian Andes
rufous-winged tyrannulet
rufous-winged tyrannulet
Taxonomy articles created by Polbot